Cuomo is an Italian surname. Notable people with the surname include:
 Politically involved Cuomo family, in the United States
 Mario Cuomo (1932–2015), governor of New York (19831995)
 Matilda Cuomo (born 1931), first lady of New York (19831995)
 Margaret Cuomo (born 1955), American radiologist and author
 Andrew Cuomo (born 1957), governor of New York (2011–2021)
 Chris Cuomo (born 1970), American journalist
 Chris Cuomo (philosopher), American philosopher
 Donna Cuomo (born 1947), member of the Massachusetts House of Representatives (1993–1999)
 Douglas J. Cuomo (born 1958), American composer
 Franco Cuomo (1938–2007), Italian journalist
 George Michael Cuomo (1929–2015), American author
 Luigi Cuomo (1905–1993), Italian fencer
 Nancy Cuomo (born 1946), Italian singer
 Nicola Cuomo (1946–2016), Italian professor and educator
 Rivers Cuomo (born 1970), American musician and frontman of the band Weezer
 Yolanda Cuomo (born 1957), American artist

See also 
 Cuomo (disambiguation)
 Governor Cuomo (disambiguation)

References

Italian-language surnames